The following is a list of programs broadcast by the American nighttime block Nick at Nite.

Current programming

Former programming

Original programming

Programming from Nickelodeon

Acquired programming

Special/cross-promotional airings

Movie presentations

Former
 Nick at Nite Movie (1985–88)
 Nick at Nite Tuesday Movie of the Week (2007–14)
 Nick at Nite Movie Nite (2014–19)
 Wild About Movies (2019–21)

Television specials
Occasionally, episodes of Rugrats and SpongeBob SquarePants have aired regularly or as marathons during Nick at Nite special events in the 1990s and 2000s. This has also occurred during crossovers with Nickelodeon special programming where the Nickelodeon programming runs into the regular Nick at Nite timeslot. A 30-year reunion special of Double Dare aired on November 23, 2016. Regular marathons occur on Nick at Nite. Usually when a show debuts, it receives an all-night or a week-long marathon. Seasonal marathons also occur for holidays such as Valentine's Day, St. Patrick's Day, Mother's Day, Father's Day, Halloween, Thanksgiving, and Christmas.

On June 17, 2019, Nick at Nite aired a simulcast of the 2019 MTV Movie & TV Awards for the first time, along with many of its sister networks. On August 26, it also aired a simulcast of the 2019 MTV Video Music Awards for the first time. In December 2019, Nick at Nite began airing a marathon of Friends to celebrate the show's 25 year anniversary since its finale throughout half of Nick at Nite's regular programming time. Nick at Nite aired a simulcast of the widely distributed One World: Together at Home on April 18, 2020.

See also
 List of programs broadcast by Nickelodeon
 List of programs broadcast by Nick Jr.
 List of programs broadcast by Nicktoons
 List of programs broadcast by TeenNick
 List of Nickelodeon original films
 Nickelodeon
 Nick at Nite
 TV Land

Notes 
1 Indicates program that had also been broadcast on Nickelodeon.
2 Indicates program that had also been broadcast on NickMom.
3 Indicates program that is/had also been on TV Land.
4 Indicates program that aired as part of Nick at Nite's 20 Years.

References

Nickelodeon
Nick at Nite
Nickelodeon-related lists